Pamela Duncan (December 28, 1924 – November 11, 2005) was an American B-movie actress who starred in the 1957 Roger Corman cult science fiction film Attack of the Crab Monsters and later appeared in the 2000 Academy Award-nominated documentary, Curtain Call, that focused on the lives and careers of the residents of the Lillian Booth Actors Home in Englewood, New Jersey.

Biography
A native of Brooklyn, New York, Duncan won several local beauty pageants as a teenager before moving to Southern California to get into film acting. She attended Cornell University and Hunter College.

Duncan worked three years in summer stock theatre. Her first role came when she appeared in the 1951 film Whistling Hills. Also in the 1950s, she played the part of Mike Hammer's secretary Velda in the mystery drama My Gun Is Quick.

On television, Duncan appeared on a number of television programs. In 1958 she appeared on Perry Mason as the murder victim and title character in "The Case of the Daring Decoy."  Other television appearances included Pony Express, Highway Patrol, Maverick, The Life and Legend of Wyatt Earp, Colt .45, Tombstone Territory,  Sea Hunt, Tales of Wells Fargo episode 14 "The Sliver Bullets,"  and in 1959 she appeared in Bat Masterson, as Rachel Lowery in the episode "Lady Luck."

In still another 1959 appearance, Duncan was cast as traveling show performer "Princess Nadja" in the episode "RX: Slow Death" on the syndicated anthology series, Death Valley Days, hosted by the "Old Ranger" (Stanley Andrews).

On November 11, 2005, Duncan died from a stroke at the Booth Home in Englewood, New Jersey. She was 80.

Filmography

References

External links

1924 births
2005 deaths
American film actresses
American television actresses
People from Brooklyn
Actresses from New York (state)
Actresses from Los Angeles
20th-century American actresses
21st-century American women